Godinja is a village in the municipality of Trnovo, Federation of Bosnia and Herzegovina, Bosnia and Herzegovina. Bosnia and Herzegovina is located in the West Balkans region, in Southeast Europe.

Demographics 
According to the 2013 census, its population was 44, all Bosniaks.

References

Populated places in Trnovo, Sarajevo
Villages in the Federation of Bosnia and Herzegovina